Bren Simmers is a Canadian poet and writer. She is the author of three collections of poetry,
Night Gears (Wolsak and Wynn 2010),
Hastings-Sunrise (Nightwood Editions 2015), and
If, When (Gaspereau Press 2021).
She is also the author of Pivot Point (Gaspereau Press 2019), a lyrical account of a nine-day wilderness canoe trip through the Bowron Lakes canoe circuit in British Columbia.

Born in Vancouver, she studied writing at the University of Victoria and has a Master of Fine Arts in Creative Writing from the University of British Columbia. She is the winner of 2022 CBC Poetry Prize for Spell World Backwards, a collection of poems inspired by how Alzheimer's affects language. Her book Hastings-Sunrise was a finalist for the 2015 City of Vancouver Book Award.
She is also the winner of an Arc Poetry Magazine Poem of the Year Award, a finalist for The Malahat Review Long Poem Prize, and was a finalist for the 2006 Bronwen Wallace Memorial Award. She lives on Prince Edward Island.

Bibliography 
 Night Gears, Wolsak and Wynn, October 2010, 
 Hastings-Sunrise, Nightwood Editions, March 2015, 
 Pivot Point, Gaspereau Press, October 2019, 
 If, When, Gaspereau Press, 2021,

References

Living people
Canadian women poets
21st-century Canadian poets
1976 births
Writers from Vancouver
21st-century Canadian women writers